The Chorus Association of Venetian Churches (Italian: Chorus Associazione per le Chiese del Patriarcato di Venezia), often shortened to Chorus Association, is a cultural conservation organisation working within the city of Venice in Italy. It works to safeguard, conserve and restore the artistic, historical and cultural heritage contained within the sixteen Venetian churches that presently constitute its membership.

Project
Chorus was founded in June 1997, set-up by public act as a non-profit association. Its initial members were the priests and rectors of the thirteen founding churches. It was added to Venice City Council's Register of Associations in August 1997 and in December 1999 the Veneto Region recognised it as a legal entity in accordance with Italian Civil Code.

In 2000, the Cassa di Risparmio di Venezia Foundation joined Chorus along with a number of lay persons. The total membership currently stands at nineteen.

Chorus brings together a network of 16 of Venice’s churches (see list below) which between them house more than a thousand works of art. The concept has been defined as an "area museum" and allows the latest conservation practices to be applied across the network. The project also follows the concept of "conservation through utilisation" whereby the demand from visitors to view the cultural works that the churches house becomes self-financing, so that maintenance, conservation and enhancement of the history, artwork and heritage can continue to take place.

Members
The 18 churches which are presently members of the Chorus Association are:

 Church of Santa Maria del Giglio 
 Church of Santo Stefano 
 Church of Santa Maria Formosa 
 Church of Santa Maria dei Miracoli 
 Church of San Giovanni Elemosinario 
 Church of San Polo
 Basilica of Santa Maria Gloriosa dei Frari 
 Church of San Giacomo dall'Orio 
 Church of San Stae 
 Church of Sant'Alvise 
 Church of Sa Pietro di Castello
 Church of the Santissimo Redentore 
 Church of Santa Maria del Rosario (Gesuati)
 Church of San Sebastiano 
 Church of San Giobbe
 Church of San Giuseppe di Castello
 Church of San Vidal
 Church of San Giacomo di Rialto

Tourism
Chorus encourages visitors to Venice by providing information and standardised payment means at all of the member Churches. It also publishes a guidebook to the churches.

References

Map

External links
 Chorus Association website

Organizations established in 1997
Organisations based in Venice
Historic preservation organizations
Culture in Venice
Historic sites in Italy
History organisations based in Italy
1997 establishments in Italy